The 2017–18 I-League was the 11th season of the I-League. Aizawl were the defending champions. NEROCA entered as the promoted team from the 2016–17 I-League 2nd Division. The season began on 25 November 2017.

Teams
All India Football Federation invited bids for new teams on 21 July 2017 from Bengaluru, Mumbai, New Delhi, Ranchi, Jaipur, Jodhpur, Bhopal, Lucknow, Ahmedabad, Malappuram and Trivandrum, among others.
On 20 September, after second round of bidding invitation, the Bid Evaluation Committee decided to award Sree Gokulam Group the right to field their team in the Hero I-League 2017–18 season onward from Kozhikode, Kerala. Bengaluru FC successfully bid for a place in 2017–18 Indian Super League season and thus was not a part of I-League. NEROCA F.C. were promoted for winning 2016–17 I-League 2nd Division. After successful hosting of FIFA U-17 World Cup, AIFF revived Indian Arrows project to field the colts in I-League.

Stadiums and locations
''Note: Table lists in alphabetical order.

Personnel and kits

Foreign players
On 2 August 2017, it was announced by the All India Football Federation that the number of foreigners for each I-League club would go up to six, with two of the six having to be born in Asia or registered with the AFC.

Indian Arrows cannot sign any foreign players as they are the AIFF developmental team.

Results

League table

Results table

Season statistics

Scoring

Top scorers

Top Indian scorers

Hat-tricks

4 Player scored 4 goals.

Clean sheets

Attendance

Average home attendances

Highest attendances

Awards

Hero of the Match

Season awards
Hero I-League 2017–18 awards were announced on March 22.

See also
 2017–18 Indian Super League season
 2018 Indian Super Cup

References

External links
 

 
I-League seasons
Ind
1